Anophthalmolabis is a genus of earwigs, the sole member of the subfamily Anophthalmolabiinae. It was cited by Srivastava in Part 2 of Fauna of India. It was also cited at an earlier date by Steinmann in his publication, The Animal Kingdom in 1986, 1989, 1990, and 1993.

References

External links 
 The Earwig Research Centre's Anophthalmolabis database Source for references: type Anophthalmolabis in the "genus" field and click "search".

Insects of Asia
Anisolabididae
Dermaptera genera